Brenda Paul is a college women's basketball coach who is currently an assistant for the Pfeiffer Falcons. She has previously been the head coach at six colleges, including Mississippi State and Elon, and has amassed over 500 career wins.

Head coaching record

References

Year of birth missing (living people)
Living people
American women's basketball coaches
Tennessee Wesleyan Bulldogs women's basketball coaches
Mississippi State Bulldogs women's basketball coaches
Georgia State Panthers women's basketball coaches
Elon Phoenix women's basketball coaches
Young Harris Mountain Lions women's basketball coaches
Berry College faculty